Fabric 30 is a DJ mix compilation album by Rub-N-Tug, as part of the Fabric Mix Series.

Track listing
  Intro (0:15)
  Claude VonStroke - Seven Deadly Strokes - Neuton (3:54)
  Röyksopp - What Else Is There (The Emperor Machine Vocal Version) - Wall of Sound (2:08)
  Jesse Rose - Evening Standard - Dubsided (3:52)
  Curtis McClaine And On The House - Let's Get Busy - Trax (5:45)
  Gary Martin - Turkish Tavern - Teknotika (4:17)
  Sir Drew - Shemale (Black Strobe Remix) - Adrift (2:31)
  Serge Santiago - Atto D'Amore (Dub) - Arcobaleno (6:41)
  Dondolo - Dragon (Shit Robot 'Breathing Fire' Remix) - Tiny Sticks (5:08)
  Slok - Lonely Child (Satoshi Tomiie 3D Remix Dub) - Saw Recordings (5:22)
  Rufuss - No Exit - Qalomota (4:35)
  Foolish & Sly - Come A Little Closer - Cynic (4:57)
  Nemesi - L'Asteroide (Original Impact Mix) - Relish (3:40)
  Force Of Nature - Blackmoon - Libyus (2:50)
  Lifelike & Kris Menace - Discopolis - Defected (8:27)
  Âme - Engoli - Sonar Kollektiv (4:01)
  Mocky - Catch A Moment In Time (Ewan Pearson’s Memory Blissed Remix) - Fine (5:15)

References

External links
Fabric: Fabric 30

30
2006 compilation albums